Vanlalzawma a politician from Mizoram who was a Member of the Mizoram (Lok Sabha constituency) in the 13th Lok Sabha and 14th Lok Sabha.
Before he became a politician, he was the president of Central Young Mizo Association (CYMA) in 1993 at the age of 37 and served two terms. During this period CYMA had wildlife conservation as its yearly goal ("nungcha humhalh kum" in Mizo) and Vanlalzawma received an award for CYMA from the President of India, for successful wildlife conservation in Mizoram.

At the age of 43, he was elected to be the MP of Mizoram in 1999 (He was a history lecturer prior to this and he has deep interest in education). Immediately after he became the MP in 2000, he successfully pursued the overdue Mizoram University Bill in the Parliament. Which as a result, Mizoram University (MZU) was established on 2 July 2001, by the Mizoram University Act (2000) of the Parliament of India.

He is a good mathematician and besides his career he loves playing Chess. He was the highest rated chess player in Mizoram for several years. He is also very good at running and has won several medals at Mizoram games in 100 meters sprint.

In the confidence voting on 22 July 2008 that the United Progressive Alliance (UPA) won with a 275-256 margin. Among these ten, two MPs toed their party line of equidistance from the Indian National Congress and Bharatiya Janata Party (BJP). Those two are:
Trinamool Congress: Mamata Banerjee and
Mizo National Front: Vanlalzawma

Education
He was educated in Pachhunga University College and North-Eastern Hill University (NEHU)and has completed his Education in MA History.

Career
He served as lecturer in Hrangbana College and was elected as President of Young Mizo Association (YMA), the largest NGO in Mizoram.

Politics
He is a member of the Mizo National Front and has represented the Mizoram constituency in the Lok Sabha since 1999. He was a member of  the following committees.
Member of Committee on Petroleum & Natural Gas
Member of Consultative Committee, Department of Youth Affairs and Sports.
Member of Committee on Human Resource Development.
Member of Committee on Ministry of Communications and Information Technology

References

Lok Sabha Member's homepage.

1956 births
Living people
Wildlife conservation
Mizo people
India MPs 2004–2009
People from Lunglei
India MPs 1999–2004
North-Eastern Hill University alumni
Lok Sabha members from Mizoram
Mizoram MLAs 2013–2018
Leaders of the Opposition in Mizoram